Fusor is a proposed term for an astronomical object which is capable of core fusion. The term is more inclusive than "star".

Motivation
To help clarify the nomenclature of celestial bodies, Gibor Basri proposed to the IAU that any "object that achieves core fusion during its lifetime" be called a  fusor.

This definition includes any form of nuclear fusion, so the lowest possible mass of a fusor was set at roughly 13 times that of Jupiter, at which point deuterium fusion becomes possible. This is significantly smaller than the point at which sustained hydrogen fusion becomes possible, around 60 times the mass of Jupiter. Objects are considered "stellar" when they are about 75 times the mass of Jupiter, when gravitational contraction, i.e. contraction of the object due to gravity, is halted by heat generated by the nuclear reaction in their interiors. Fusors would include active stars, dead stars, and many brown dwarfs.

The introduction of the term "fusor" would allow for a simple definition:
 Fusor – An object capable of core fusion
 Planemo – A round non-fusor
 Planet – A planemo that orbits a fusor

In this context, the word round is understood to mean "whose surface is very nearly on the gravitational equipotential", and orbits to mean "whose primary orbit is now, or was in the past around", and capable implies fusion is possible sometime during the existence of the object by itself.

See also 

 Dwarf planet
 Exoplanet
 Gas giant 
 Mesoplanet
 Planetar (astronomy)
 Planetesimal
 Planetoid
 Pulsar planet

Footnotes

References 

Star types
Definition of planet